A biochore is a subdivision of the biosphere consisting of biotopes that resemble one another and thus are colonized by similar biota. The concept is relevant in biogeography to refer to a units regardless it rank (regardless the scale).

References

Ecology